Craig Anderson (born 30 October 1980) is an Australian former professional left-handed baseball pitcher who has played for the Sydney Blue Sox in the Australian Baseball League as well as the Seattle Mariners and Baltimore Orioles in Major League Baseball.

Early career
Anderson first signed with the Seattle Mariners in 1999. Anderson featured in the 2000 All-Star Futures Game. He played in the Mariners system through 2004, posting 11 wins and a 3.56 ERA with the Triple-A Tacoma Rainiers that year.

He played for Australia in the 2006 World Baseball Classic, after which he joined the Baltimore Orioles. He began 2008 pitching middle relief for the Norfolk Tides of the Triple-A International League. It was his second season in Norfolk, and his fifth in Triple-A. He became a free agent at the end of the season. He played for Australia in the 2009 WBC, starting the team's first game of the tournament against Mexico.

Sydney Blue Sox
Anderson played the first nine seasons in the Australian Baseball League, announcing his retirement at the conclusion of the 2018-19 Australian Baseball League season and currently holds the record for most games started as a pitcher (88), innings pitched (556.2), losses (32) and tied first for most wins (35) with Daniel Schmidt. He finished his career 35–32 with a 3.61 ERA in 99 games.

Craig was awarded the pitcher of the year during the 2012–13 ABL season.

References

External links

2006 World Baseball Classic – Team Australia statistics

1980 births
Living people
Australian expatriate baseball players in Canada
Australian expatriate baseball players in the United States
Baseball pitchers
Baseball players at the 2000 Summer Olympics
Baseball players at the 2004 Summer Olympics
Bowie Baysox players
Brockton Rox players
Everett AquaSox players
Frederick Keys players
Medalists at the 2004 Summer Olympics
Norfolk Tides players
Olympic baseball players of Australia
Olympic medalists in baseball
Ottawa Lynx players
People from Gosford
San Antonio Missions players
San Bernardino Stampede players
Sportsmen from New South Wales
Tacoma Rainiers players
Wisconsin Timber Rattlers players
2006 World Baseball Classic players
2009 World Baseball Classic players
Olympic silver medalists for Australia
Águilas Cibaeñas players
DOOR Neptunus players
Australian expatriate baseball players in the Netherlands
Australian expatriate baseball players in the Dominican Republic
Southern Maryland Blue Crabs players
Sydney Blue Sox players